The singles discography of Elvis Presley began in 1954 with the release of his first commercial single, "That's All Right". Following his regional success with Sun Records, Presley was signed to RCA Victor on November 20, 1955. Presley's first single with RCA, "Heartbreak Hotel", was a worldwide hit, reaching the No. 1 position in four countries and the top 10 in many other countries. Other hit singles from the 1950s include "Hound Dog", "Don't Be Cruel", "Love Me Tender", Too Much", "All Shook Up", "(Let Me Be Your) Teddy Bear", "Jailhouse Rock", "Don't", "Hard Headed Woman" and "A Big Hunk o' Love". On March 24, 1958, Presley entered the United States Army at Memphis, Tennessee, and was stationed in Germany. He left active duty on March 5, 1960.

Following his return to civilian life, Presley released his first new single, "Stuck on You", which was a No. 1 hit in the United States and reached the top 10 in ten other countries around the world. The follow-up single, "It's Now or Never", was another worldwide hit, peaking no lower than No. 2 in 13 countries. 1960 and 1961 saw the release of two more U.S. No. 1 hits, "Are You Lonesome Tonight" and "Surrender". Beginning in late 1961 the majority of Presley's singles were released to promote his films and their associated soundtrack albums. Hit singles from this period include "Can't Help Falling in Love", "Return to Sender", "Bossa Nova Baby" and "Kissin' Cousins". As Presley's success with singles from his movie soundtracks began to diminish in the late 1960s, he released "If I Can Dream", from his 1968 NBC-TV special, Elvis. The success of the song and television special brought about a resurgence of interest in Presley and his recordings, bringing him two  top 10 hits in 1969, "In the Ghetto" and "Suspicious Minds".

In the 1970s, Presley's chart success began to diminish slightly. He had only three U.S. top 10 singles in that decade: "Don't Cry Daddy", a live recording of "The Wonder of You" and "Burning Love". Other top 40 hits from the 1970s include "Kentucky Rain", "You Don't Have to Say You Love Me", "Separate Ways", "T-R-O-U-B-L-E", "Hurt", "Moody Blue" and "Way Down".

Following Presley's death on August 16, 1977, new posthumous singles have been released in addition to many of his original singles being reissued around the world. The first single to be issued following Presley's death was a live recording of "My Way", taken from the soundtrack of his final television special, Elvis in Concert. In 1978 another live recording was issued as a single, "Unchained Melody". In 2002, a remix of "A Little Less Conversation" by DJ Junkie XL was released to promote the compilation album ELV1S: 30#1 Hits. It was a worldwide hit and returned Presley to the top 10 in many countries around the world. In 2003, a remix of "Rubberneckin' by DJ Paul Oakenfold was released to promote the compilation album ELVIS: 2nd to None. It reached the top 10 in a few countries but overall was not as successful as its predecessor.

Presley has 54 singles certified by the Recording Industry Association of America totaling 50 million in sales. In 2012, Presley was ranked second best selling singles artist in United Kingdom with 21.6 million singles sold.  Music historian Joel Whitburn ranked Presley as the number 1 charting singles artist of all time in the US.

Singles

1950s
The US chart positions prior to "One Night"/"I Got Stung" are pre-Billboard Hot 100.

1960s

1970s

Posthumous singles

Charted reissued singles

Billboard Year-End performances

Other charted songs

RIAA certifications 
The Recording Industry Association of America (RIAA) began to certify gold albums and singles in 1958, and Elvis Presley's first RIAA award, a gold single for "Hard Headed Woman", was certified on August 11, 1958. In August 1992, he was awarded with 110 gold, platinum and multi-platinum albums and singles, the largest presentation of gold and platinum record awards in history. According to Presley's record label, RCA, he is the best selling artist of all time, with sales over 1 billion records worldwide in all formats (600 million in the United States alone).

The RIAA does not certify sales of less than 500,000 units for albums and singles. Elvis has had numerous albums and singles which have sold hundreds of thousands of units each but have not reached the 500,000 threshold. Taken together, these could add up to millions in total sales that are not recognized by the RIAA.

RIAA sales certifications are not automatic. The record company must pay a fee and request an audit from the RIAA in order to certify sales. During Elvis' life, RCA submitted few of Elvis' recordings for RIAA certification. Instead of paying for RIAA certification, RCA and other companies would simply award their own "Gold Record" to artists based on their internal sales figures. As a consequence, some of Elvis' early sales information has been lost. RCA and BMG have researched archives and old files in an effort to reconstruct Elvis' sales figures. This has led to Elvis receiving numerous RIAA certifications posthumously.

Notes

See also 
List of songs recorded by Elvis Presley
Elvis Presley albums discography

References

Further reading 
Guralnick, Peter and Jorgensen, Ernst (1999). Elvis: Day By Day – The Definitive Record of His Life and Music. New York: Ballantine Books. 
Jorgensen, Ernst (1998). Elvis Presley: A Life In Music – The Complete Recording Sessions. New York: St. Martin's Press.

External links 
 
 Elvis The Music official music label site
 ElvisRecords.us The Elvis Presley Record Research Database
Elvis Presley Enterprises – Official site of the Elvis Presley brand
The World's Music Charts

Country music discographies
 
Rock music discographies
Discographies of American artists